Gbekile David Osemeke (born May 10, 2001) and also known as Boy Spyce is a Nigerian Afro-fusion singer and songwriter who hails from Edo State in the Southern region of Nigeria.

Career
The Nigerian afrobeat singer began making covers of popular songs, posting them on social media. His most significant success came through his cover of Essence by Wizkid. This made the CEO of Mavin Records, Don Jazzy, notice his talent and gave him a slot in his music academy on 14 April 2022. Boy Spyce released his anticipated debut EP twenty-four hours later.

Early life
Boy Spyce was born on May 10, 2001, and hails from Edo State, located in the southern region of Nigeria. His parents had six children and raised him in Jakande Estate Isolo. He started laying the foundation of his music pursuit in primary school. While in primary 5 the celebrated artist penned down his first song. That convinced him that he has talent in music and his interest grew stronger.

Education
Boy Spyce attended Lagos State Model College Kankon, Badagry in the city of Lagos. While he was in school, he represented the academic institution in many music competitions. After his O’ level and sitting for his WAEC. He got admission to study Accounting at a prestigious university.

References 

Living people
21st-century Nigerian singers
Nigerian male singers
University of Lagos alumni
Nigerian male singer-songwriters
2000 births